Jonas Obleser (born 1975 in Waiblingen) is a German psychologist and neuroscientist.

Academic career
Jonas Obleser studied psychology at the University of Konstanz and received his diploma in psychology in 2001.
In 2004 he was awarded a doctorate (Dr. rer. nat.) from the University of Konstanz.

After research stays with Aditi Lahiri (Konstanz), Sophie Scott (London) and Angela Friederici (Max Planck Institute for Human Cognitive and Brain Sciences), he was appointed as a Max Planck Research Group leader and set up the  research group "Auditory Cognition" at the Max Planck Institute for Human Cognitive and Brain Sciences in Leipzig, Germany.

In 2015, Jonas Obleser was appointed Professor at the University of Lübeck, Department of Psychology. He holds a Chair in Physiological Psychology and Research Methods and is a member of the   Center of Brain, Behavior, and Metabolism (CBBM).

Jonas Obleser has served as editor for the journals Journal of Neuroscience, NeuroImage, and eLife.

Research
Jonas Obleser's research focus lies in neural dynamics of communication,  using mainly audition as a “model system”. He has contributed to understanding the links of auditory cortex to more distributed, Large scale brain networks, using fMRI, EEG, MEG, computational neuroscience and psychophysics techniques.

Jonas Obleser's research interests range from processes underlying human cognition and perception, to translational aspects of ageing, to methodological and statistical aspects of neuroscience research. The neural processing of speech and age-related changes therein are central components of his research.

Jonas Obleser is the author of over 110 scientific publications.

Honours
In 2015, Jonas Obleser was awarded an ERC Consolidator Grant. As part of this project, he and his research group are investigating the mechanisms of neuronal adaptation in the ageing listening brain.

In 2014, Obleser won the Young Investigator Spotlight Award of the Advances and Perspectives in Auditory Neuroscience Symposium (APAN).

In 2010, Jonas Obleser was awarded a 5-year grant for a Max Planck Research Group.

References

External links
 PubMed: Full list of scientific publications  
 Professional Website.
 Profile at Google Scholar
 ORCID profile: Jonas Obleser (0000-0002-7619-0459)

1970s births
Living people
German neuroscientists
German psychologists
University of Konstanz alumni
Academics of University College London
Academic staff of the University of Lübeck
People from Waiblingen